The final of the women's artistic team all-around competition at the 2012 Summer Olympics was held at the North Greenwich Arena in London on 31 July 2012. Eight teams qualified for the final, from a total of twelve that competed in the qualifications round.

Each team was composed of five gymnasts. In the final, each team selected three gymnasts to compete on each apparatus. All three scores on each apparatus were summed to give a final team score.

The United States team, known as the Fierce Five, finished first in qualifications and won the gold medal in the final. Russia won the silver, and Romania won the bronze. It was Romania's 10th consecutive Olympic medal in the event, a streak that started in 1976.

The medals were presented by Habib Macki of Oman, Aïcha Garad Ali of Djibouti, Angela Ruggiero of the United States, and members of the International Olympic Committee. The medalists' bouquets were presented by Slava Corn of Canada, the vice president of the Fédération Internationale de Gymnastique (FIG); Walter Nyffeler of Switzerland; Zobeira Hernandez Delgado of Canada; and members of the FIG Executive Committee.

Participating teams

The following teams qualified for the Olympics by finishing in the top 8 at the 2011 World Artistic Gymnastics Championships:

The following teams qualified by finishing in the top 4 at the 2012 Olympic Test Event, which was open to the teams that had finished 9th through 16th at the 2011 World Championships:

Qualification results

The top 8 teams in the initial round of competition on 29 July qualified to the team final on 31 July:

Results

Women's artistic team all-around
2012
Olympics
2012 in women's gymnastics
Women's events at the 2012 Summer Olympics